The 2008 Utah Democratic presidential primary took place on February 5, 2008, with the votes of 23 pledged delegates to the 2008 Democratic National Convention at stake.  The primary was one of many held on Super Tuesday.  Barack Obama won the primary.

Polls

Results

See also
 2008 Democratic Party presidential primaries
 2008 Utah Republican presidential primary

References

Utah
2008 Utah elections
2008
2008 Super Tuesday